James Richman (Džeims Ricmens, born March 1989 in Smārde, Tukums) is Latvian-born investor and businessman. He is best known for his investments in biotechnology, particularly the world's first medical breakthrough in 3D-printed heart and for backing the Three Seas Initiative. He also invests in artificial intelligence.

Biography 
Richman was born in Smārde, Tukums. He was diagnosed with Asperger's syndrome.

In 2020, he committed to investing $18 million towards the research and development towards efforts of COVID-19 treatment and vaccine. He also invested in developing countries such as Vietnam, Cambodia, the Philippines, and Thailand. 

He lives in Monaco.

References

External links 

Latvian businesspeople
1989 births
People from Tukums
Living people